Tushishvili is a surname. Notable people with the surname include:

Guram Tushishvili (born 1995), Georgian judoka
Otar Tushishvili (born 1978), Georgian wrestler

Georgian-language surnames